Bol is the soundtrack album of the 2011 Urdu-language Pakistani film Bol by Shoaib Mansoor.

Overview and reception
All songs are mixed and mastered by Kashif Ejaz. The singers include Atif Aslam, Sajjad Ali, Hadiqa Kiani, Ahmed Jahanzeb, Shabnam Majeed, Sahir Ali Bagga, Bina Jawad, Ali Javed. The song Hona Tha Payar was written and composed by a 16-years-old boy Ali Javed who sold the copyrights of song to the team Bol. The soundtrack was successful and generally received positive reviews from critics. However, one critical review published in The Express Tribune called the movie's soundtrack "A surprising disappointment" and saying that "The film’s music sounds unoriginal and boring. In fact, people unfamiliar with Sajjad Ali and Ahmed Jehanzaib, might confuse it for Bollywood music."

Track listing

References

2011 soundtrack albums
Urdu-language albums
Soundtracks by Pakistani artists